Angustalius besucheti is a moth in the family Crambidae. It was described by Stanisław Błeszyński in 1963. It is found in Democratic Republic of the Congo.

References

Crambinae
Moths described in 1963
Moths of Africa
Endemic fauna of the Democratic Republic of the Congo